The 1968 NCAA College Division football season was the 13th season of college football in the United States organized by the National Collegiate Athletic Association at the NCAA College Division level.

Conference standings

Rankings

College Division teams (also referred to as "small college") were ranked in polls by the AP (a panel of writers) and by UPI (coaches). The national champion(s) for each season were determined by the final poll rankings, published at or near the end of the regular season, before any bowl games were played.

College Division final polls
In 1968, the wire services disagreed as to the champion. UPI picked San Diego State (9–0–1) as number one, while the AP panel chose North Dakota State. San Diego State did not play in the postseason, while North Dakota State later won the Pecan Bowl to finish 10–0.

United Press International (coaches) final poll
Published on November 27

Denotes team won a game after UPI poll, hence record differs in AP poll

Associated Press (writers) final poll
Published on December 5

Bowl games
The postseason consisted of four bowl games as regional finals, all played on December 14. The Boardwalk Bowl succeeded the Tangerine Bowl, and the Pecan Bowl moved within Texas, from Abilene to Arlington. In 1969, the Grantland Rice Bowl moved from Murfreesboro, Tennessee to Baton Rouge, Louisiana.

See also
 1968 NCAA University Division football season
 1968 NAIA football season

References